Louis Kossuth Luse (May 6, 1854 – December 26, 1920) was an American lawyer and politician. He was a member of the Wisconsin State Assembly from Dane County, Wisconsin

Biography

Born in the town of Dane, in Dane County, Wisconsin, Luse graduated from the University of Wisconsin Law School in 1876 and then practiced law in Watertown, Wisconsin, Waterloo, Wisconsin, and finally in Stoughton, Wisconsin. He served on the Dane County Board of Supervisors in 1880. In 1881, Luse served in the Wisconsin State Assembly as a Republican. He then served as an Assistant Attorney General of Wisconsin. In 1904, Luse was a candidate for justice of the Wisconsin Supreme Court but was defeated by James C. Kerwin. Luse moved to Superior, Wisconsin, to practice law with his son Claude Luse, who later became a United States district judge. He died in Superior, Wisconsin, from a heart ailment.

References

External links

1854 births
1920 deaths
People from Dane County, Wisconsin
Politicians from Superior, Wisconsin
University of Wisconsin Law School alumni
Wisconsin lawyers
County supervisors in Wisconsin
19th-century American lawyers
People from Stoughton, Wisconsin
Republican Party members of the Wisconsin State Assembly